The 2012 6 Hours of Fuji is an endurance auto race held at the Fuji Speedway in Oyama, Shizuoka, Japan on 14 October 2012.  The race is the seventh round of the 2012 FIA World Endurance Championship season, and marks the return of the former Fuji 1000 km event for the first time since 2007.

Qualifying

Toyota earned their second pole position of the season in front of the home crowd at the circuit also owned by the company.  Kazuki Nakajima set a lap time of 1:27.499 in the Toyota TS030 Hybrid, nearly two tenths of a second ahead of Marcel Fässler's Audi.  Neel Jani gave Rebellion Racing the top spot amongst the LMP1 privateers to put another Toyota motor on the second row of the starting grid, just ahead of Strakka Racing's Honda.  Starworks Motorsport continued their streak of four consecutive pole positions in the LMP2 category, with a 1:32.367 lap set by Stéphane Sarrazin in the team's Honda, with the ADR-Delta Oreca-Nissan second in the category.

In LMGTE Pro, Marc Lieb gave Porsche their second pole of the season with Team Felbermayr-Proton, three tenths of a second ahead of Gianmaria Bruni's AF Corse Ferrari.  The LMGTE Am category was led by Jean-Philippe Belloc who earned Larbre Compétition their first pole of the year in the Chevrolet Corvette.

Qualifying result
Pole position winners in each class are marked in bold.

  The No. 50 Larbre Corvette, No. 55 JWA-Avila Porsche, and No. 97 Aston Martin were all demoted three grid positions for cutting corners during the qualifying session.

Race

Race result
Class winners in bold.  Cars failing to complete 70% of winner's distance marked as Not Classified (NC).

References

External links

 

2012
Fuji
6 Hours of Fuji